Critics Circle may refer to:

 Theatre
 The Critics' Circle
 New York Drama Critics' Circle
 Outer Critics Circle Award

Film
 Film Critics Circle of Australia
 Florida Film Critics Circle
 London Film Critics Circle
 National Book Critics Circle
 New York Film Critics Circle
 San Francisco Film Critics Circle
 Vancouver Film Critics Circle